Luker (from lucre) is idiomatic Australian English for "money".

It can also refer to the following people:

 James Luker - American politician and lawyer
 Joseph Luker - First police officer to be killed on active duty in Australia
 Kristin Luker - Professor of Sociology at the University of California
 Kelan Luker - Bass player in Submersed, a four-piece alternative metal band from Stephenville, Texas
 Archibald Leonard Luker - Author of the lyrics for Dear Land of Guyana, of Rivers and Plains, national anthem of Guyana
 Nicholas Luker - Lecturer in Russian at the University of Nottingham
 Rebecca Luker - Broadway singer and actress